The University of Wisconsin High School was a public high school in Madison, Wisconsin, originally encompassing 7-12th grades. It opened September 1914 in a building erected for that purpose. The school was created and maintained by the University of Wisconsin–Madison as part of its teacher education program, for educational experimentation and for observation and practice teaching.

When the school opened, students in the lower years did not have typical seventh and eighth grade work, but the beginnings of high school work. They were under the same general regulations and discipline as older pupils.

The last graduating class received their diplomas on June 4, 1964. The building then was used by the UW School of Journalism, followed by the UW School of Social Work. In 1993 an all-class reunion was held, and shortly after demolition began to allow for the construction of a genetics research building on the site.

Notable alumni 
 John Bardeen – scientist who was twice awarded the Nobel Prize
 Joseph Wheeler Bloodgood – Wisconsin State Assembly
 Uta Hagen – actress
 John Carrier Weaver – educator, UW president, 1971-77
 Deborah Mitchell Dryden - costume designer

References

External links 
 Wisconsin High School alumni page

Educational institutions established in 1914
1964 disestablishments in Wisconsin
Education in Madison, Wisconsin
Defunct schools in Wisconsin
Former university-affiliated schools in the United States
Educational institutions disestablished in 1964
1914 establishments in Wisconsin
Demolished buildings and structures in Wisconsin
Buildings and structures demolished in 1993